Bobby Gurney (13 October 1907 – 14 April 1994) was a football forward who is the highest goal scorer in the history of his only senior club as a player, Sunderland.

Early years

Born in Stewart Street, Silksworth, Sunderland, his father Joe was a miner at Silksworth Colliery. His mother, Elizabeth, stayed at home to look after Bobby, his three brothers and one sister. Bobby took up football as a child, playing for his village team. His older brother, Ralph, also played football, as a goalkeeper. All his brothers went into pit jobs after leaving school.

Sunderland

Bobby was signed to Sunderland in May 1925, after being spotted by Charlie Buchan while playing for top non-league side Bishop Auckland. He made his debut nearly a year later against West Ham United on 3 April 1926, scoring once in a 3–2 defeat. He would play for the next three seasons alongside a striker who hit at least 35 league goals in each of his four full seasons at Roker Park, Dave Halliday, the most prolific goals to games striker in Sunderland's history.

After Halliday's departure Gurney was regularly the club's top goalscorer, garnering his best tally of 33 goals in the 1930–31 season. Among his career highlights were ten hat-tricks and two four-goal hauls. He was also one of just a handful of Sunderland players to score five times in a match.

Bobby went on to make 388 league appearances for Sunderland, scoring 228 goals, which makes him the club's all-time top scorer. He won a First Division Championship medal in 1936. He scored in a 3–1 win over Preston North End at Wembley in the 1937 FA Cup Final.

International

Gurney won one international cap, representing England against Scotland at Hampden Park before 129,693 spectators.

Management

On retiring from playing he stayed in the game and in 1950 became manager of Midland League side Peterborough United. He was subsequently manager of Darlington, and finally had a short spell as manager of Hartlepool United.

Honours 
Sunderland
 Football League First Division: 1935–36
 FA Cup: 1936–37
 FA Charity Shield: 1936; runner-up: 1937
 War Cup runner-up: 1941–42

Individual
 Football League First Division top scorer: 1935–36
 Sunderland top scorer: 228 goals

Managerial statistics

References

External links
Sunderland AFC Official website, players D-G

1907 births
Footballers from Sunderland
1994 deaths
English footballers
England international footballers
Sunderland A.F.C. players
English football managers
Peterborough United F.C. managers
Darlington F.C. managers
Hartlepool United F.C. managers
Association football forwards
FA Cup Final players